Maxwell Ebong Patrick Akora (born 31 August 1965) is a Ugandan politician and a member of the parliament representing Maruzi county in Apac District on the ticket of Uganda People's Congress (UPC).

Life and education 
Akora is a Christian of Anglican denomination. He earned a bachelor's degree in commerce from Makerere University and a master's degree in Business Administration from the University of Cambodia. In 2019, Akora declared himself as the Oyima clan head with media commercials announcing his installation but the clan elders disowned him cautioning clan members not to attend the ceremony.

Political career 
Akora was elected to the parliament representing Maruzi County on the platform of UPC. He serves on the committees of Information Communication and Technology, Finance, and Planning, and Economic Development. He was appointed into the sectoral committee as Vice Chairperson of the Information and Communications Technology (ICT) committee, deputizing Tororo North MP, Annet Nyakecho. The members of his political party, UPC in the parliament protested this appointment as the position is reserved for the ruling party in party parliament.

References 

Living people
1965 births
21st-century Ugandan politicians
Uganda People's Congress politicians
Members of the Parliament of Uganda
Makerere University alumni
Ugandan Anglicans
Place of birth missing (living people)
University of Cambodia alumni